Dimitrios Jim Tasikas (born March 19, 1975) is a Greek-American guitarist and founder of the Rochester-based progressive metal band Contrarian.

Early life 
Tasikas is a Greek citizen, he holds dual citizenship with the United States and Greece. His father and mother are Greek immigrants who moved to the U.S. from Florina, Greece.

Career
Tasikas is the primary songwriter and performs a number of different roles in Contrarian. These include complex guitar parts, keyboards and occasional lead guitar. He shares guitar duties with Brian Mason, playing mainly technical rhythm sections. Tasikas is also known for his extensive guitar collection which has been featured in Decibel Magazine. As of September 2020, Tasikas has been endorsed by ESP guitars and primarily uses their M Series guitars.

Death By Metal Assistant Producer 
Tasikas is credited as co-producer in the documentary Death By Metal which focuses on life and career of musician Chuck Schuldiner.

Guitars 
ESP M-III DXM Natural 6-string guitar Japan
ESP M-II DXM Orange Burst 6-string guitar Japan
ESP LTD M-I Custom ‘87 Black 6-string guitar 
Charvel San Dimas Style 1 Trans Gold USA
ESP USA M-7 FR Flamed Maple - See Thru Black Cherry Sunburst 7-String Guitar

Amplification 
 Laney IRT120H Ironheart Guitar Amplifier Head, 120 Watts
 Friedman BE-100 Deluxe 3-channel 100-watt Tube Head

Discography

Manic
Recollection of What Never Was (1996) - guitar/keyboards

Delirium Endeavor 
Flight of the Imagination(1998) - guitar
Twelve Cusp(2004) - guitar

Contrarian 

 Predestined (2014)
 Polemic (2015)
 To Perceive Is to Suffer (2017)
 Their Worm Never Dies (2019)
 Only Time Will Tell (2020)

References 

Living people
1975 births